Apna Sapna Money Money is a 2006 Indian Hindi comedy film released on 10 November 2006. Directed by Sangeeth Sivan, Apna Sapna Money Money is a tale of several characters who are in a mad race to be rich. The film, produced by Subhash Ghai, is a situational comedy. The film stars Suniel Shetty, Ritesh Deshmukh, Shreyas Talpade, Celina Jaitly, Koena Mitra, Anupam Kher, Riya Sen, Jackie Shroff, Bobby Darling, Rajpal Yadav, Chunky Pandey, and Sunil Pal. The movie got mixed reviews and was declared a "semi-hit" at the box office.

Plot

6 Alvares House in Bandra, Mumbai, is the residence of myopic, widowed, devout Hindu, Satyabol Shastri, who lives there with his daughter, Shivani. Shivani is in love with her Christian neighbor, Arjun Fernandes, who is a mechanic and lives with his wanna-be singer sister, Julie, and a younger ailing sister, Titli. Satyabol disapproves of Arjun and wants his daughter to marry Sarju Maharaj Banaraswale's son. Other than Satyabol chasing Badshah, the pet dog of Arjun, and ending up in the women's bathroom, the area is fairly peaceful.

Then Arjun and his friends try to think of a plan to stop Sarju from marrying his son to Shivani but can't. So Arjun calls his best friend Kishan to help them. Kishan comes disguised as Sarju Maharaj Banaraswale by tricking the real Sarju into getting off the train and as soon as he gets off the train, some goons who think he is a relative of Kishan catch him and take him to find out where Kishan is. Meanwhile, Kishan becomes Sarju and convinces Satyabol that his (Sarju's) son is not good for his (Shashtri's) daughter by dancing in the bar and kissing Julie who was in the act. Then Shashtri informs the fake Sarju that he does not want to marry his daughter to Sarju's son and that he can go now. So having finished his mission, Kishan prepares to leave when Arjun tells him to stay back as he loves Julie but Kishan refuses to say that he is not destined for Julie. Then after Arjun leaves and Rana turns up with the real Sarju but when Kishan says that all the is with Sarju they leave Kishan and run after Sarju while Kishan escapes, disguises himself as a woman named Sunaina and says 'she' is Arjun's aunty and soon Shashtri falls in love with her. Then in the neighbourhood also comes Matha Prasad who runs a dairy farm and moonlights as the hitman of Bangkok-based underworld Don, Carlos. The once honest cop Namdev Mane ( pronounced as Maa-ne ) teams up with Carlos' girlfriend Sania who is on the lookout for hidden diamonds and facing bankruptcy - Carlos himself - as they face off in one of the most hilarious stand-offs to seek wealth and to fulfill their individual dreams.

Cast
Suniel Shetty as Namdev Mane, an honest cop dedicated to putting criminals behind bars. Some clever criminals who work in disguise have kept him on his toes.
Ritesh Deshmukh as Kishan / Sania Badnaam, a young man from Goa whose brain is full of every conceivable trick to make a quick buck. He cons people by slipping into different outfits and by assuming many guises. Julie's Boyfriend turned Husband.
Shreyas Talpade as Arjun Fernandes, an honorable man who is content making a simple living with whatever money he earns from his garage. And later on, he meets the woman of his dreams Shivani Shastri.
Celina Jaitly as Sania Badnaam, a con-woman who uses her beauty to lure men and leave them penniless later. Beautiful and unwilling to surrender to emotions easily, Sania craves only money and power. 
 Koena Mitra as Julie Fernandes. Julie is a bar dancer with quite a reputation, but behind her raunchy exterior is a compassionate, kind-hearted woman who goes out of her way to help the needy. Kishan's Girlfriend turned Wife.
Anupam Kher as Pandit Satyabol Shastri, the stubborn, overprotective, and aging father of Shivani who will not give away his daughter easily.
Riya Sen as Shivani Shastri who is a simple girl from a Brahmin family, but her strict father, Pandit Satyabol Shastri, would never let her marry Arjun. It will take a lot of effort to win her hand from her father.
Jackie Shroff as Danny Carlos is a merciless underworld don with wacky fashion sense. He works from Bangkok and operates in India through Sania.
Sanjay Mishra as Sarju Maharaj Banaraswale, a man who comes to see Shivani to make her his daughter-in-law.

Rajpal Yadav as Matha Prasad
 Chunky Pandey as Rana Jang Bahadur
Bobby Darling as Bobby Mohabbati
 Sunil Pal as Matha Prasad's assistant

Music
All songs featured in the film were composed by Pritam and lyrics penned by Shabbir Ahmed apart from the song 'Paisa Paisa' which was written by Mayur Puri. The film score was composed by Sunil Singh.

References

External links
 
 

2006 films
2006 comedy films
2000s Hindi-language films
Cross-dressing in Indian films
Films featuring songs by Pritam
Indian comedy films
Films directed by Sangeeth Sivan